The Organization for Researching and Composing University textbooks in the Humanities or SAMT* is a public organization and publisher in Iran established by the "High Council for Cultural Revolution" after the Iranian Cultural Revolution in 1985. The organization publishes academic textbooks and sources on humanities in Iranian universities.

See also
Higher Education in Iran
Iranian Cultural Revolution

Notes and references

External links
SAMT Official website

Educational organisations based in Iran